Stage 12 of the 2013 Giro d'Italia was contested on 16 May, and the race concluded on 26 May. The second half of the race was almost entirely situated within Italy; it started with a categorised flat stage from Longarone to Treviso, before four mountain stages – as well as a mountainous individual time trial between Mori and Polsa – en route to the finish in Brescia, where the race concluded with a road stage for the first time since 2007. The race also crossed over into France during the fifteenth stage, ending with a summit finish on the Col du Galibier. After the second rest day of the race, the peloton returned to Italy in the following stage, from Valloire in France to Ivrea.

Having picked up the overall race lead after the eighth stage,  rider Vincenzo Nibali was able to hold onto the race leadership for the entire second half of the Giro, and as a result, achieved the second Grand Tour general classification victory of his career; he had previously won the 2010 Vuelta a España for the  team. Nibali held a 41-second lead margin over 's Cadel Evans until the fourteenth stage, when Nibali attacked on the final climb to the Monte Jafferau outside Bardonecchia, and was able to gain 45 seconds on Evans by finishing second to 's Mauro Santambrogio. Nibali later won two stages during the final week of the race, further extending his overall advantage, and eventually completed the race with a winning margin of close to five minutes. Evans was unable to hold onto second place overall, as he faded on the final climb of the race to Tre Cime di Lavaredo; he ultimately finished third overall behind  rider Rigoberto Urán, who had become his squad's leader after Bradley Wiggins was forced to withdraw.

Aside from the overall race battle, Mark Cavendish was able to avenge his close defeat in the points classification at the 2012 race – where he lost the red jersey by a single point to  rider Joaquim Rodríguez – by taking the classification on the final day in Brescia. The  rider's victory in Brescia, his fifth of the race – he achieved three in the second half of the race, with other victories on stages 12 and 13 – allowed him to become only the fifth rider to complete a clean sweep of points classification victories at Grand Tours. Giovanni Visconti was another rider to take multiple victories during the second half of the race, taking solo victories at the Col du Galibier and into Vicenza. The second half of the race was also adversely affected by snow, with three stages being re-routed and a fourth having to be cancelled due to heavy snow and treacherous conditions; the cancelled stage was the first due to weather since the 1989 Giro d'Italia.

Stage 12
16 May 2013 — Longarone to Treviso, 

The second half of the race started with a stage ideally favoured towards the sprinters; with a parcours of  – one of the shortest of the race – the stage was predominantly downhill from the start in Longarone, all the way to the finish in Treviso. Along the course, there were two fourth-category climbs alternating with the two intermediate sprint points – coming in the comunes of Pieve d'Alpago and Vidor respectively – within the opening two-thirds of the stage. Once the riders reached Treviso, they completed a  loop around the city; the final metres involved the crossing of a bridge, before the line on the Viale Bartolomeo Burchiellati.

Wet conditions awaited the riders in Longarone, where the breakaway was initiated almost immediately after the start, with a four-rider move going clear. Lammertink's team-mate Marco Marcato bridged the gap not long after, to make it a quintet. With a lead of nearly three-and-a-half minutes, all bar De Backer fell in the treacherous conditions, but were able to get back on their bikes not long after. The sprinters' teams slowly brought the lead group back, holding a 25-second lead going into the final loop around Treviso; the quintet managed to hold off until inside the final kilometre.

From there, the  lead-out train swooped to the front, with Gert Steegmans providing the perfect launch for Mark Cavendish to take his third stage win of the race, and what was to be the 100th win of his professional career. 's Vincenzo Nibali maintained his 41-second overall lead ahead of the 's Cadel Evans. Further behind,  rider Bradley Wiggins suffered the most notable time loss during the stage. With no fewer than four team-mates around him, Wiggins lost 3' 17" on the day to the main group, falling out of the top ten overall. Wiggins attributed his lack of performance to an ever-worsening medical ailment; he had been taking antibiotics due to him suffering from a cold and chest infection. Due to this,  general manager Dave Brailsford stated that the team would now be backing Rigoberto Urán, lying third overall, as their best hope of winning the race.

Stage 13
17 May 2013 — Busseto to Cherasco, 

At , the thirteenth stage was also the longest stage of the 2013 Giro d'Italia. The parcours, which ran through six different regions, was flat from the start to around the  point. From there, there were several uncategorised hills on the route, passing through the two intermediate sprint points – which were competed at the comunes of Castagnole delle Lanze and Alba respectively – before reaching the day's only categorised climb. From there, the riders descended towards the finish with several rolling hills in between; the expectations were still there for a sprint finish, but not a certainty. Prior to the start of the stage, former contenders for the overall classification, Bradley Wiggins and Ryder Hesjedal both withdrew from the race.

A small group attacked the peloton behind, but after several kilometres off the front of the bunch, this group was pulled back, leaving the three leaders around thirty seconds clear.

 – looking to set up Mark Cavendish for a fourth stage win at the race – were stationed at the front of the peloton, and slowed the pace of the chase, and allowed the lead trio to gain several seconds of an advantage, pushing the lead out to almost a minute. Boem was dropped shortly after, while Lastras and Bak were joined by another group of riders, with seven going clear from the peloton. With his fourth victory of the race, Cavendish became the sixth rider to win 40 Grand Tour stages, and the first rider to take successive Giro stages since Alessandro Petacchi in 2009.

Stage 14
18 May 2013 — Cervere to Bardonecchia, 

The originally-scheduled climb to Sestriere, a second-category gradual ascent, was removed from the itinerary, with the peloton being re-routed along roads in the Susa Valley to Oulx. The race rejoined the original itinerary at Oulx; in total,  was added to the stage distance. From there, the parcours rose to steadily to an intermediate sprint at Bardonecchia, before the climb to the finish on the Jafferau.

When they had recovered to the main field, the lead group started to increase their advantage. As the race moved towards the Jafferau,  took up station on the front of the peloton, slimming the numbers in the main group. Before the final climb, Trentin was dropped by his three companions, and was soon caught by the main field on the climb.

The leaders held a lead of around four minutes at the foot, at which point, Colbrelli attacked. Only Paolini could stay with him, as they set about trying to hold off the front. Pellizotti caught the duo, and soon set off alone after the leaders, pulling within two minutes before being caught. Paolini dropped Colbrelli with around  remaining, and held a 43-second lead over the fast-closing chasers. The two remained clear until the end, with Santambrogio taking the stage win, his first in a Grand Tour.

Stage 15
19 May 2013 — Cesana Torinese to Les Granges du Galibier (France), 

The snow forced organisers to move the stage finish further down the climb, to the memorial in honour of Marco Pantani. Pantani soloed to a stage victory after attacking on the Col du Galibier during the 1998 Tour de France, before winning at Les Deux Alpes; the catalyst to his overall victory in the race. At one point, both the Col du Galibier and the day's opening climb, the Col du Mont Cenis, were reportedly off the itinerary due to the atmospherical conditions, but both were eventually ascended during the stage. The first-category Col du Mont Cenis climb started in Italy, and crossed over into France with a gradual -long climb, averaging around 6.2%, before the race descended down towards Saint-Michel-de-Maurienne, and the start of the second-category Col du Télégraphe. After a slight descent to Valloire, the Col du Galibier ascent commenced, with almost  covered before the finish.

With continued uncertainty about the safety of the Col du Mont Cenis, racing was neutralised until near the top of the ascent, where mountains classification leader Stefano Pirazzi attacked with 's Robinson Chalapud. The duo were joined on the descent by five more riders as the peloton allowed them to gain a lead of over two minutes.  rider Pieter Weening soon went off the front on his own, but could not force the pace by himself and soon fell back to rejoin the rest of the breakaway. The group held a maximum lead of over six minutes, but it was around a third of that by the time they reached the Col du Télégraphe. Pirazzi and Weening were strongest in the early kilometres, before Giovanni Visconti and 's Matteo Rabottini were able to join back up with them. Visconti dropped his breakaway companions with around  remaining, setting off on a solo effort. Rabottini tried to chase him on the descent from the Télégraphe, but ultimately, Visconti soloed to his first Grand Tour stage win. Rabottini's resolve lasted until inside the final kilometre when he cracked, and allowed a group of four riders to do battle for second. The overall contenders group came across the line 54 seconds down on Visconti.

Stage 16
21 May 2013 — Valloire (France) to Ivrea, 

The final week of racing commenced after the race's second rest day the previous day; the sixteenth stage was a transitional stage, returning to Italy following the Col du Galibier finish of the previous stage. Starting in Valloire, the parcours of  began with a descent from the Col du Télégraphe, going in the opposite direction from the way that the peloton had climbed previously. Having reached Saint-Michel-de-Maurienne, the parcours sloped up again towards Modane and onwards to the Mont Cenis, this time in reverse, crossing back into Italy. From there, a  loop was tackled, which contained a third-category climb. The climb, the Andrate, averaged around 8% in gradient – reaching 13% in places – and was expected to deny the sprinters of any chance of winning the stage. The day's breakaway was formed prior to the Mont Cenis, when an attack by 's Wilco Kelderman instigated a move of sixteen riders in total, while six more riders were able to bridge up towards the leaders before they had reached the summit of the climb.

The lead gap had been more than halved by the time the field reached the first intermediate sprint with around  remaining, in the comune of Agliè. Counter-attacks were key on the run-in towards Ivrea for the first time; after several mini-attacks,  rider Emanuele Sella was the first to gain a manageable advantage over the rest of the breakaway.

He was later joined by Kelderman and 's Danny Pate, and they were around twenty seconds clear as they hit Ivrea. A five-rider group made contact on the final climb, among whom was mountains classification leader Stefano Pirazzi, who continued to extend his points lead. The remnants of the peloton had also caught up with the leaders, with young rider leader Carlos Betancur of  leading Pirazzi over the summit. All the main contenders for the race were up front, with the exception of 's Mauro Santambrogio, who would ultimately lose over two minutes on the day. Intxausti saluted his former team-mate Xavier Tondo while coming across the line; crossing his fingers to form an X, in honour of Tondo, who was killed prior to a training ride with Intxausti in May 2011.

Stage 17
22 May 2013 — Caravaggio to Vicenza, 

With the exception of the final stage of the race heading into Brescia, the seventeenth stage marked one of the last opportunities for a sprinter to prevail in the 2013 Giro d'Italia. Following the two intermediate sprint points in San Bonifacio and Orgiano, the climb of the Crosara was narrow and technical; averaging 6.8% over the course of  – with portions of the climb reaching 12% in gradient – meaning that teams would have to take extra care in consideration of the climb, hoping to keep their sprinters in check prior to the descent and finish into Vicenza.

The quartet's lead reached a maximum of around five minutes at the midpoint of the stage, but was gradually reduced from then on.  took station on the front of the peloton, in the hope of keeping points classification leader Mark Cavendish in contention for the stage victory; other sprinters' teams also helped to bring the time gap down. Belkov was first to be dropped, after falling into difficulty with around  remaining. The other three riders from the lead group held an advantage of around one minute as they hit the foot of the Crosara. Cavendish ran into trouble on the climb, but remained as leader of the points classification overnight.

Rubiano lifted the pace, which saw Dockx being dislodged from the front, while a second burst of acceleration saw his only other lead companion, Durbridge, being dropped as well.  launched a two-pronged attack through Alessandro Proni and Danilo Di Luca, with Di Luca forcing himself clear in chase of Rubiano; he caught him with just under  remaining, when Giovanni Visconti attacked from the peloton, joining quickly after bridging the 30-second gap. Visconti attacked over the top of the climb solo, gaining a maximum advantage of 35 seconds, but did enough to hold on, despite nearly crashing, for his second stage win in four days – his team's third in succession, after Beñat Intxausti's win on stage 16 – by 19 seconds. 's Ramūnas Navardauskas led the main group across the line in second, mistakenly believing he had won the stage, while the main contenders were also positioned within the group, leaving the general classification unchanged.

Stage 18
23 May 2013 — Mori to Polsa, individual time trial (ITT)

The second of two individual time trials to be held in the 2013 Giro d'Italia, the eighteenth stage was deemed as a mountainous time trial – the form of the discipline returning to the race after a one-year hiatus – in the Trentino-Alto Adige/Südtirol region, in northern Italy. As was customary of time trial stages, the riders set off in reverse order from where they were ranked in the general classification at the end of the previous stage.

Andriato was not the first rider to reach the line, as  rider Miguel Mínguez – who started directly behind him on the road, at a one-minute interval – passed him and went on to record a time of 48' 55" for the course.

Damiano Caruso broke into the 45-minute region with the next quickest time for the course, with the weather conditions changing around the time that he was reaching the finish in Polsa. From the sun that had greeted the earlier runners on the course, the weather worsened and soon heavy rain was falling. Caruso's time was ultimately good enough for third on the stage; the first rider to beat the time was 's Samuel Sánchez, who recorded a time of 45' 27", a time which enabled him to move into the top ten in the general classification. However, the best performance was left to the overall leader, Nibali. Setting the best time at the intermediate time-check, Nibali completed the course in 44' 29", to take his third Giro stage victory. He also managed to get within 24 seconds of catching his main rival for the general classification, 's Cadel Evans, who had started three minutes before him. As a result, Nibali's overall lead grew to 4' 02" over Evans, with  rider Rigoberto Urán ten seconds further back in third.

Stage 19
24 May 2013 — Ponte di Legno to Val Martello–Martelltal, 

However, much like the previous weekend's stages to Bardonecchia and the Col du Galibier, the scheduled route was affected by poor weather conditions; race organisers had been expecting snow to fall on the potentially key mountain stages. This materialised, and as such, the two main climbs for the day – the -long Passo di Gavia and the  Passo di Stelvio (the scheduled Cima Coppi for the Giro), the highest two climbs of the race – were removed from the route. A revised route was released the night before the scheduled start of the stage.

Further adverse conditions overnight dropped even more snow on the scheduled itinerary, and ultimately, race organisers cancelled the stage on safety grounds; the first weather-related cancellation of a stage in the Giro since 1989 – when the sixteenth stage was cancelled – and the first cancellation of any form since 2001, when the peloton refused to race in the eighteenth stage, after drug raids. Competing riders and teams supported the decision that the race organisers made in relation to the stage.

Later in the day, it was announced that  rider Danilo Di Luca had tested positive for the banned glycoprotein hormone erythropoietin (EPO) – which controls red blood cell production – during an out-of-competition drugs test held a week in advance of the race. After receiving notification of his rider's positive test, team manager Angelo Citracca stated that Di Luca had been sacked – after less than a month with the squad – and that they were launching legal proceedings against Di Luca. Di Luca – who had previously served a fifteen-month suspension after testing positive for continuous erythropoietin receptor activator (CERA) at the 2009 Giro d'Italia – himself expressed his "surprise" at the positive test, while race director Michele Acquarone angrily chastised Di Luca at a press conference, describing him as "stupid".

General classification after cancellation of stage 19

Stage 20
25 May 2013 — Silandro–Schlanders to Tre Cime di Lavaredo, 

Like several other stages to be held during the second half of the 2013 Giro d'Italia, the penultimate stage of the race had to be re-routed due to unfavourable weather conditions which resulted in potentially dangerous riding conditions. With the previous day's cancellation of the Passo di Stelvio, the climb to Tre Cime di Lavaredo became the Cima Coppi. The final climb averaged over 11% for the final , but reached 18% in places.

As the leaders reached Cortina d'Ampezzo, their advantage was around three minutes; upon leaving the comune, Popovych attacked his companions. Brutt and Hansen were able to bridge back up, before Brutt attacked of his own accord. Weening caught up with Hansen, and the duo set off in chase of Brutt, with the peloton around one minute behind the leader, and closing on the climb.

By the top of the Passo Tre Croci, Brutt was around 30 seconds clear of Weening – who had dropped Hansen – with the leaders group a further 20 seconds behind. In the driving snow, Brutt was caught with around  remaining by Weening, Pirazzi, 's Gianluca Brambilla and the 's Eros Capecchi. Nibali was joined by Colombian duo Rigoberto Urán and Carlos Betancur for a period, and after catching Capecchi, Nibali launched another attack, soloing away to his second consecutive stage victory, and all but securing the race overall. 's Fabio Duarte bridged up to his compatriots, and ultimately won the sprint for second place, seventeen seconds behind, ahead of Urán and Betancur. In the general classification, Nibali extended his overall lead to 4' 43" over Urán, who had moved ahead of 's Cadel Evans – who cracked on the climb – for second place overall. Betancur was another mover; he moved from seventh to fifth overall, and reclaimed the lead of the young rider classification from  rider Rafał Majka.

Stage 21
26 May 2013 — Riese Pio X to Brescia, 

After the previous five editions of the Giro d'Italia had finished with individual time trial stages, the 2013 edition ended with a mass-start road stage. With no categorised climbs on the route, and very little in the way of undulation during the  parcours, it was widely expected to finish in a mass sprint finish in Brescia. Once the riders had reached Brescia, the peloton had to complete eight laps of a -long city centre circuit, with the race's final intermediate sprint coming on the third passage through the finish line. Going into the stage, the points classification was also set to be settled, as overall leader Vincenzo Nibali held an eleven-point advantage over 's Mark Cavendish, with 41 points on offer during the stage. With little competition in the stage, the field remained together all the way to Brescia.

Cavendish had reduced the gap in the classification to three points, after taking the honours in the opening intermediate sprint at Sirmione. 's Stefano Garzelli was allowed to head into Brescia on his own, in his final Giro d'Italia, before  took up the head of the pace again. Nibali finished within the peloton to take the general classification, and his second Grand Tour overall win, after the 2010 Vuelta a España. 's Carlos Betancur and Stefano Pirazzi also confirmed their respective wins in the young rider classification and the mountains classification.

Notes

References

2013 Giro d'Italia
Giro d'Italia stages